King Salmon is an unincorporated community in Humboldt County, California, United States, located on the shore of Buhne Point directly across from the entrance to Humboldt Bay, slightly south of Eureka and  north of Fields Landing, at an elevation of . It has a Eureka zipcode and area code and is part of Greater Eureka although outside the city limits.

Overview
Once a small fishing enclave, primarily containing summer homes or vacation homes, King Salmon is now a residential community, the former site of the Humboldt Bay Nuclear Power Plant, and the location of the Sequoia Humane Society, a privately funded no-kill shelter for dogs and cats that sponsors "Woofstock" every year at Eureka's Halvorsen Park.

King Salmon is served by the Redwood Transit System, has marina services and a recreational vehicle park as well as a public picnic area on the top of Buhne Point adjacent to the power plant.  Construction of a groin in 1983 slowed erosion along the shoreline of King Salmon, sand was added to make the beach.

References

Unincorporated communities in Humboldt County, California
Eureka, California
Unincorporated communities in California
Populated coastal places in California